Ibalonius bimaculatus is a species of harvestmen from the family Podoctidae. The species is endemic to Mahe Island and Silhouette Island of Seychelles.

References

Harvestmen
Animals described in 1902
Endemic fauna of Seychelles